The Primetime Emmy Award for Outstanding Sound Mixing for a Comedy or Drama Series (One-Hour) is an award handed out annually at the Creative Arts Emmy Awards. Prior to 1983, regular series competed alongside limited series and movies for Outstanding Achievement in Film Sound Mixing.

In the following list, the first titles listed in gold are the winners; those not in gold are nominees, which are listed in alphabetical order. The years given are those in which the ceremonies took place:



Winners and nominations

1970s
Outstanding Achievement in Film Sound Mixing

Outstanding Achievement in Film or Tape Sound Mixing

Outstanding Achievement in Film Sound Mixing

1980s

Outstanding Film Sound Mixing for a Series

Outstanding Sound Mixing for a Drama Series

1990s

2000s

Outstanding Single-Camera Sound Mixing for a Series

Outstanding Sound Mixing for a Comedy or Drama Series (One-Hour)

2010s

2020s

Programs with multiple awards

5 awards
 ER
 Game of Thrones

4 awards
 Star Trek: The Next Generation

3 awards
 Hill Street Blues

2 awards
 House
 The Mandalorian 
 24 
 The X-Files

Mixers with multiple awards

5 awards
 Alan Bernard
 Onnalee Blank
 Doug Davey
 Ronan Hill
 Bill Nicholson
 Mathew Waters

4 awards
 Chris Haire
 Michael Jiron
 Richard L. Morrison
 Eddie J. Nelson
 George E. Porter

3 awards
 John Asman
 David Concors
 Richard Dye
 Robert L. Harman
 Ken S. Polk
 Allan L. Stone
 Bill Teague

2 awards
 Juan Cisneros
 James Clark
 Russell C. Fager
 Chris Fogel 
 William Gocke
 Lowell Harris
 Shawn Holden 
 Franklin Jones Jr.
 Ken Kobett
 George A. Lara
 Bill Marky
 Mike Olman
 Tim Philbin
 Theodore Soderberg
 Von Varga
 Scott Weber
 David John West
 Bonnie Wild

Programs with multiple nominations

10 nominations
 ER

9 nominations
 Hill Street Blues
 NYPD Blue

8 nominations
 24

7 nominations
 Game of Thrones
 Star Trek: The Next Generation

6 nominations
 Better Call Saul
 CSI: Crime Scene Investigation
 The Sopranos

5 nominations
 Lost
 The West Wing

4 nominations
 Boston Legal
 Downton Abbey
 Homeland
 House
 House of Cards
 L.A. Law
 Law & Order
 Northern Exposure
 Stranger Things
 The X-Files

3 nominations
 Battlestar Galactica
 Breaking Bad
 Chicago Hope
 China Beach
 Dexter
 The Handmaid's Tale
 The Marvelous Mrs. Maisel
 Mr. Robot
 Ozark
 St. Elsewhere
 Tour of Duty
 Westworld
 The Young Indiana Jones Chronicles

2 nominations
 The A-Team
 Boardwalk Empire
 Burn Notice
 Cagney & Lacey
 Deadwood
 Falcon Crest
 Glee
 Lois & Clark: The New Adventures of Superman
 Mad Men
 Magnum, P.I.
 The Mandalorian 
 Miami Vice
 The Practice

Notes

References

Sound Mixing for a Comedy or Drama Series (One-Hour)